Joyride is the third studio album and seventh overall project by American singer Tinashe. It was released through RCA Records on April 13, 2018. The album features guest appearances from Offset, Ty Dolla Sign, French Montana, Little Dragon, and Future. The album also features production by Stargate, Dre Moon, Hit-Boy, T-Minus, and others.

The album received generally positive reviews from music critics, most of whom praised the album's composition and themes; however, some criticized it for it not being cohesive like Tinashe's previous studio albums. The album debuted at number 58 on the US Billboard 200, selling 9,800 album-equivalent units, of which 4,710 came from pure sales.

The album was supported by three singles: "No Drama" featuring Offset, "Faded Love" featuring Future, and "Me So Bad" featuring French Montana and Ty Dolla Sign.

Background
On September 2, 2015, Tinashe released a teaser for Joyride on YouTube. On September 9, Tinashe leaked the buzz single "Party Favors" featuring rapper Young Thug as a way to get the ball rolling on her label's part. On October 2, 2015, Tinashe released another song, "Player" featuring Chris Brown, as the first intended lead single of the album. On October 21, 2015, Tinashe was featured on British electronic duo Snakeships' track "All My Friends", which reached the top 20 in five countries. A few weeks later, on November 17, Tinashe held a breakfast listening party for Joyride at the Sony Club in New York City, which was attended by reporters and various other members of the music industry. At this event, she played at least one song that wound up on the final version of Joyride: the album's closing track, "Fires and Flames." Two other songs played that day — "Fearless" and the Max Martin-produced "Prisoner" — have not been released.

After a few months without releasing any new music, Tinashe released a new intended lead single for the project, entitled "Superlove". The song was released on July 15, 2016 and the music video, directed by Hannah Lux Davis, debuted on August 12, 2016 on MTV's Snapchat to rave reviews. The video on YouTube reached one million views in just a day and a half. On September 15, 2016, with a MTV Wonderland performance, Tinashe released "Company" as the album's intended second single. However, this ended up being the first and only single off her 2016 album Nightride. Perhaps conceived of as a holdover until Joyride was ready to be released, Nightride featured many of the songs that were supposed to be on the original version of Joyride, including "Sacrifices", "Soul Glitch", "Ghetto Boy" and "Touch Pass" (which she initially premiered at Joyride'''s November 2015 listening party and performed on the Joyride World Tour in early 2016). The promo singles "Ride of Your Life" and "Party Favors" (without Young Thug) were also included on Nightride.

On March 16, 2017, Tinashe released yet another intended lead single for Joyride, which was also initially premiered at Joyrides November 2015 listening party, "Flame". In a March 30, 2018 interview, Tinashe claimed that the release of "Flame" as a lead single was her record label's idea, saying: "I wasn’t forced, but it was one of these situations where it was like 'Okay, I will trust you guys and this is what you believe is the best decision so I'm going to get behind it', because that's more advantageous than to sabotage my own songs... And when that wasn't necessarily successful, I realized that it was my turn to get back into the driver's seat as far as curating every move I made from there on out." After continuing to work on the album through the summer of 2017, Tinashe announced the release of three new singles from Joyride on January 12, 2018. "No Drama" featuring Offset was released as the first single on January 18, 2018, with an accompanied music video directed by Sasha Samsonova. "Faded Love" featuring Future was released the following month, on February 12. A vertical video was released via Spotify on February 16, and on YouTube three days later.

On March 16, 2018, Tinashe finally revealed the Joyride artwork on her Instagram and announced the album would be released on April 13, 2018. On March 30, 2018, the third single "Me So Bad", featuring Ty Dolla Sign and French Montana, was released along with a Sahsa Samsonova-directed music video. With this release came the digital pre-order for Joyride. On April 25, 2018, a special edition of Joyride was released exclusively in Japan, which includes the first three original intended singles ("Player", "Superlove", and "Flame") as bonus tracks, as well as new track "L-O-V-E". The version of "Player" present on this edition features AK-69 instead of Chris Brown.

Writing and recording
The writing and recording for the album went through several phases. In late January 2015, Tinashe was reported to be working with writers and producers from Prescription Songs (Cirkut, Ammo, Rock City, Jakob Kasher, Chloe Angelides), Max Martin and Taylor Parks on the album. After months of silence after the release of the album's then-latest lead single "Flame", Tinashe on July 11, 2017, confirmed that she was still working on her new album with producers Mike Will Made It, TM88, Metro Boomin, Diplo, Boi-1da, Charlie Handsome and others.

In an April 5, 2018 article in Vulture, Tinashe stated: "Once I brought in producers and writers, we were in there every day being creative... We set the vibe, had Taco Tuesday parties. That was a huge turning point for me. Once that summer happened, I regained a huge sense of confidence and purpose: 'Okay, I'm doing this. I really made this happen. I’m gonna make my best music ever.' That's what we did." In this Vulture article, Tinashe admitted that "three [different] versions of this album exist" and that there "are probably 200 songs" total that were recorded over the course of a three-year period.

Title and packaging
Tinashe explained to Billboard the meaning behind the title: "I always had it in the back of my head, but it started to become more and more relevant to my current state of my career. With all this traveling I've done this past year and everything I've gone through, it just really feels like an adventure, a journey, a ride."

The album cover art features Tinashe posing in a futuristic gown along with a spike-covered jetpack emerging from her back. The last page of the Joyride booklet as part of the CD features a page dedicated to her thanks, including her long-time attorney Dina LaPolt, who has previously worked with Fifth Harmony, Britney Spears, deadmau5, among others: "Thank you Dina LaPolt and Danielle Price for all you have done to finally push this project out. My fans and I are forever grateful."

Critical reception

Joyride received generally positive reviews from music critics. At Metacritic, which assigns a normalised rating out of 100 to reviews from mainstream critics, the album has an average score of 66 based on thirteen reviews, indicating "generally favorable reviews". 

Israel Daramola of Spin wrote in a positive review that the album is "a cool and sexy record," and "well-crafted and ambitious." For Exclaim!, Ryan B. Patrick scored the album a 7 out of 10, stating that "Joyride is a stop-start journey that doesn't quite stall out, but does feel like some ground has been lost." Andy Kellman of AllMusic awarded the album 3.5 out of 5 stars, stating "the highlights are filled with rich details and seductive hooks", along with stating that "the songs 'Salt', and 'Fires and Flames', invalidate all the claims that Tinashe is one-dimensional." In a positive review, Zoë Madonna of The Boston Globe stated "the most fascinating offerings on Joyride are that the singer recorded herself in her home studio", and that "in these tracks, she touches something stellar." In another positive review of the album, Hannah Mylrea of NME gave the album 4 out of 5 stars, calling "Joyride brilliantly good fun", and calling the album "mainly worth the two year wait."

In a mixed review of the album, Ben Devlin of musicOMH gave the album 2.5 out of 5 stars, stating that "the intro and hard-edged title track create a sense of concept," however that "it is discarded for the song 'No Drama'," and that "a sense of cohesion never quite returns to the album." In another mixed review of the album, Roisin O'Connor of The Independent awarded the album 3 out of 5 stars, saying "Joyride has its shining points, and attempts to remain true to a cohesive, moodier tone," however that "it's missing the strong, catchier elements that helped Tinashe rise in the first place."

Commercial performance

Joyride debuted at number 58 on the US Billboard 200 for the week of April 28, 2018, selling 9,800 album-equivalent units in its first week, of which 4,710 came from pure sales. She debuted at number 12 on the Digital Album Sales chart that same week, a chart that ranks the top 50 of pure albums sales that week. The album sales are a decrease in what was originally predicted, being originally predicted to sell 15,000–20,000 album-equivalent units, with 5,000–7,000 being pure sales. The album also reached number 29 on the US Billboard Top R&B/Hip-Hop Albums chart. The album debuted at number 55 on the Canadian Albums Chart, becoming the singer's first album to chart on the chart.

The album achieved similar success internationally, reaching number 78 on the UK Albums Chart, making it her first album to chart since 2014's Aquarius, reaching the same peak as Aquarius. In Australia, the album performed similarly, reaching number 76 on the ARIA Charts. On the Dutch Albums chart, the album peaked at number 103, becoming the singer's first album to chart on the chart.

Tour
In the summer of 2015, Tinashe joined Nicki Minaj for US concerts on The Pinkprint Tour. She also joined Katy Perry in both September, and October, in the South American leg of the Prismatic World Tour.

Tinashe announced the Joyride World Tour on January 12, 2016, to support the album. Beginning in February 2016, it was scheduled through May 2016 including dates in North America, Europe, Asia, and Oceania. The tour was ultimately canceled as Tinashe wanted to focus on making new songs for the album. Tinashe also revealed another promotional single, "Ride of Your Life", on February 2, 2016.

Track listing
Credits adapted from Tidal, ASCAP and BMI.*

Notes
  signifies a co-producer.
  signifies an additional producer.

Sample credits
 "Joyride" samples "Vulnerable" performed by Tinashe featuring Travis Scott.
 "Me So Bad" contains a sample of "Go Wild" performed by Ian Thomas.
 "Ooh La La" contains a sample of "Dilemma" performed by Nelly featuring Kelly Rowland and elements of "Some Cut" performed by Trillville.

Personnel
Credits adapted from Tidal.Musicians Peter Lee Johnson – violin 
 Felix Snow – bass 
 Raymon "Big Play Ray" Holton – guitar 
 Matt Johnson – keyboards Technical'''

 Erik Madrid – mixing 
 Jaycen Joshua – mixing 
 Mark Ralph – mixing 
 Drew Smith – engineering 
 Tom A.D. Fuller – engineering 
 William Binderup – engineering assistance 
 Maddox Chhim – engineering assistance 
 David Nakaji – engineering assistance 
 Ben Milchev – engineering assistance 
 Chris Athens – mastering 
 Tinashe – recording 
 Miagi – recording 
 Felix Snow – recording 
 Soundz – recording

Charts

Release history

References

2018 albums
Tinashe albums
RCA Records albums
Albums produced by Hit-Boy
Albums produced by T-Minus (record producer)
Albums produced by Stargate
Albums produced by The-Dream
Albums produced by Boi-1da
Albums produced by Allen Ritter
Albums produced by J. White Did It
Albums produced by Hitmaka